Gland flower is a common name for several plants and may refer to:
 Adenanthos macropodianus
 Adenanthos terminalis